The Hawai'i Pacific Health Great Aloha Run is a road race that takes place annually in Honolulu, Hawaii on the third weekend in February (Presidents' Day in the United States).  It is a charity event that benefits Carole Kai Charities, a philanthropic fund run by Hawaii entertainer Carole Kai.  Kai, Honolulu Marathon founder Jack Scaff, M.D., and publicist-journalist Buck Buchwach founded the race in 1985, and since its inception it has donated over $14 million to over 100 non-profit organizations in Hawaii.  

Kaiser Permanente was the title sponsor for the 2010 race until 2018, when Hawai'i Pacific Health took the title sponsorship. Prior to that, local telephone company Hawaiian Telcom was the title sponsor from 2005 to 2009, while the Honolulu Advertiser has been a sponsor of the race since its inception.

The  course starts in downtown Honolulu on Nimitz Highway across from Aloha Tower, and runs west on Nimitz Highway along Honolulu Harbor, under the Interstate H-1 viaduct near Honolulu International Airport, and along Kamehameha Highway, finishing on the floor of Aloha Stadium.  The Aloha Tower to Aloha Stadium route gives the race its name.

About 25,000 runners, mostly Hawaii residents, run the race each year.  This number also includes as many as 5,000 members of the United States Armed Forces who run in formation as the "Sounds of Freedom" division.  The Great Aloha Run is the second largest road race in Hawaii, after the Honolulu Marathon, which attracts an international field and is marketed heavily in Japan.

References

Sports in Honolulu
Road running competitions in the United States